Arahura may refer to:

 Arahura (canoe), a Māori migration canoe
 Arahura (twin screw ship), a 1905 twin-screw steam passenger and cargo ship
 Arahura Marae, a New Zealand West Coast tribal meeting ground
 Arahura River, a New Zealand West Coast river
 DEV Arahura, a ferry that formerly operated on the Interisland Line